Noal Akins (August 21, 1938 — October 30, 2022) was a Republican politician originally from Blue Mountain, Mississippi.  He served four terms in the Mississippi House of Representatives from 2004 to 2012. He is a graduate of the University of Mississippi at Oxford.

After her successful election in the 2019 general election, his daughter, Nicole Akins Boyd, became a member of the Mississippi State Senate.

References

1938 births
Living people
People from Tippah County, Mississippi
Republican Party members of the Mississippi House of Representatives
University of Mississippi alumni
21st-century American politicians